Kirzhachsky District is an administrative and municipal district (raion), one of the sixteen in Vladimir Oblast, Russia. It is located in the west of the oblast. Its administrative center is the town of Kirzhach. Population:   45,188 (2002 Census);  The population of Kirzhach accounts for 70.5% of the district's total population.

References

Notes

Sources

Districts of Vladimir Oblast